Pronsky (masculine), Pronskaya (feminine), or Pronskoye (neuter) may refer to:
Pronsky District, a district of Ryazan Oblast, Russia
Pronsky (rural locality) (Pronskaya, Pronskoye), name of several rural localities in Russia
Pronsky (family), a princely family of Rurikid stock